Covina-Valley Unified School District or "C-VUSD," is a unified school district located in Covina, California, United States. C-VUSD serves most of Covina, a large portion of West Covina, small portions of Glendora, Irwindale and San Dimas and the unincorporated communities of Citrus, Ramona and Vincent.

On June 15, 2020, the board of education unanimously appointed Dr. Elizabeth Eminhizer to serve as the superintendent of the Covina-Valley Unified School District. Previously, Dr. Eminhizer served C-VUSD as the assistant superintendent of educational services since July 2014. Dr. Eminhizer has worked in public education for over 25 years and is dedicated to serving students in the San Gabriel Valley.

Schools
There are 4 high schools (including one continuation), 3 middle schools, 9 elementary schools in the district, and 1 online learning program.

High Schools
Covina High School
Fairvalley High School (continuation)
Northview High School
South Hills High School

Middle Schools

Las Palmas Intermediate School
Sierra Vista Intermediate School
Traweek Intermediate School

Elementary Schools

Barranca Elementary School
Ben Lomond Elementary School
Cypress Elementary School
Grovecenter Elementary School
Manzanita Elementary School
Merwin Elementary School
Mesa Elementary School
Rowland Avenue Elementary School
Workman Avenue Elementary School
Covina-Valley Learning Options Academy (C-VLOA)

Enrollment
Enrollment in the 2020–2021 school year was 11,332. The majority of students are Hispanic with a significant White and Asian minority and a smaller African Americans and Filipino minority.

District Ethnic breakdown (2020–2021) 

78.8% Hispanic
6.9% White
6.9% Asian
2.7% African American
3.0% Filipino
0.2% Pacific Islander
0.3% Native American and Alaska Native
1.2% Multiple or no response

External links
CVUSD Website

School districts in Los Angeles County, California
 Covina, California
Ramona, Los Angeles County, California
San Dimas, California
West Covina, California
Irwindale, California